The  is an electric multiple unit (EMU) commuter train type operated by the private railway operator Sagami Railway (Sotetsu) in Japan since June 2009, replacing aging 5000 and 7000 series trains. Based on the JR E233-1000 series design, cars have four pairs of sliding doors per side.

Formation
, the fleet consists of five ten-car sets, based at Kashiwadai Depot and formed as follows.

Car 2 has two single-arm pantographs, and cars 4 and 8 each have one.

Interior
Cars 1 and 10 have wheelchair spaces. Cars 4 and 9 are designated as mildly air-conditioned cars.

History

The first set was delivered from Tokyu Car Corporation (now J-TREC) in October 2008, and entered revenue-earning service from 15 June 2009.

A fifth set, 11005, was delivered in January 2013.

See also
 Sotetsu 10000 series

References

External links

 Fiscal 2008 investment plan, 22 May 2008 Sotetsu website, Retrieved 23 June 2008 

Electric multiple units of Japan
11000 series
Train-related introductions in 2009
Tokyu Car multiple units
J-TREC multiple units
1500 V DC multiple units of Japan